The 1982 Minnesota Senate election was held in the U.S. state of Minnesota on November 2, 1982, to elect members to the Senate of the 73rd and 74th Minnesota Legislatures. A primary election was held on September 14, 1982.

The Minnesota Democratic–Farmer–Labor Party (DFL) won a majority of seats, remaining the majority party, followed by the Independent-Republicans of Minnesota. The new Legislature convened on January 4, 1983.

Results

See also
 Minnesota House of Representatives election, 1982
 Minnesota gubernatorial election, 1982

References

1982 Minnesota elections
Minnesota Senate elections
Minnesota